Fate most commonly refers to destiny, a predetermined course of events.

Fate may also refer to:

 Moirai or Fates, in Greek mythology
 Time and fate deities, personifications of time and human fate in polytheistic religions

Fate franchise 
Fate is a Japanese media franchise:
Fate/stay night, a 2004 visual novel and its adaptations
Anime television series based on the visual novel:
 Fate/stay night, a 20062007 anime series
 Fate/stay night: Unlimited Blade Works, a 20142015 television series
Anime films:
 Fate/stay night: Unlimited Blade Works, a 2010 film
 Fate/stay night: Heaven's Feel, a film series that debuted in 2017
Light novels and manga:
 Fate/Zero, a light novel series and its adaptations
 Fate/Apocrypha, a light novel series and its adaptations
 Fate/Strange Fake, a light novel series
 Fate/kaleid liner Prisma Illya, a manga series and its adaptations
 Video games:
 Fate/Unlimited Codes, a 2008 fighting game for PlayStation Portable and PlayStation 2
 Fate/Extra, a 2010 role-playing game for PlayStation Portable
 Fate/Grand Order, an online free-to-play role-playing mobile game for Android and iOS
 Fate/Extella, a role-playing game for PlayStation 4, PlayStation Vita, Nintendo Switch and Microsoft Windows
 Fate/Extella Link

Film and television 
 Fate (1913 film), a 1913 silent short film
 Fate (2001 film), a 2001 Turkish film
 Fate (2008 film), a 2008 South Korean film
 Fate: The Winx Saga, a live-action adaptation of Winx Club
 The Fate of the Furious (2017 film), marketed as "F8" and sometimes pronounced "Fate"
 "Fate" (In the Heat of the Night), an episode of In the Heat of the Night
 Fate Testarossa, a character in the anime series Magical Girl Lyrical Nanoha and its sequels
 "Fate", a screenwriter whose credits include the documentary info wars

Literature 
 Fate (magazine), a magazine of paranormal phenomena
 Doctor Fate, a succession of DC Comics sorcerer characters, first published in 1940
 Fate (comics), a character associated with Doctor Fate, or the eponymous comics series
 "Fate" (short story), a 1931 short story by P. G. Wodehouse

Music 
 Fate (Janacek) or Destiny, a 1907 opera by Leoš Janáček and Fedora Bartošová
 Fate (band), a Danish heavy metal band with an eponymous 1985 album
 Symphony No. 5 (Beethoven), nicknamed Fate

Albums 
 Fate (Dr. Dog album), 2008
 Fate: The Best of Death, 1992
 Fate (EP), by Prudence Liew, 1989
 Fate, by Velvet Acid Christ, 1994

Songs 
 "Fate" (1953 song), written by Robert Wright and George Forrest for the musical Kismet
 "Fate" (Bleak song), 2006
 "Fate" (Chaka Khan song), 1981
 "Fate", by 8stops7 from Birth of a Cynic, 1998
 "Fate", by Band-Maid from World Domination, 2018
 "Fate", by Kokia, 2010
 "Fate", by Our Last Night from Age of Ignorance, 2012

Video games 
 Fate video game series published by WildTangent games:
 Fate (video game), a 2005 computer action RPG
 Fate: Undiscovered Realms, a 2008 stand-alone expansion to the original
 Fate: The Traitor Soul, a 2009 second stand-alone expansion to the original
 Fate: The Cursed King, a 2011 final instalment of the Fate series
 Fate: Gates of Dawn, a 1991 computer role-playing game
 FATE (Chrono Cross), a powerful entity in the video game Chrono Cross

People 
Fate Echols (1939-2002), American football player
Hugh Fate (1929-2021), American dentist and politician
Mary Jane Fate (1933-2020), Alaska Native activist

Places 
 Fate, Texas, a city in the U.S.
 Fate, Shulan, a town in Jilin Province, China

Other uses 
 Cell fate determination
 Fate (role-playing game system), Fantastic Adventures in Tabletop Entertainment, a 2003 generic rules system for role-playing games
 Fate (political party), a defunct political party in Greece
 Fate (company), an Argentine tire manufacturer
 Feline arterial thromboembolism (FATE), the most common heart disease in domestic cats, see Hypertrophic cardiomyopathy#Other animals
 First American Transcendental Exhibition, an alternative name for Bhagavad-gita Museum
 Focus assessed transthoracic echocardiography, a protocol for transthoracic echocardiography
 Future Affordable Turbine Engine, a US Army program for improving turboshaft and turboprop engines

See also
 F8 (disambiguation)
 Fates (disambiguation)
 Fatal (disambiguation)
 Fatalism, a philosophical doctrine
 Karma, a concept in Indian religions